Elachista crocogastra is a moth of the family Elachistidae. It is found in Madagascar and South Africa.

Description
The wingspan is about 6.5 mm. The ground colour of the forewings is yellowish white. The hindwings are white. Adults have been recorded in August, December, February and April.

References

crocogastra
Moths described in 1908
Moths of Madagascar
Moths of Africa